William Alston Hutchinson (26 March 1839 – 20 June 1897) was an English-born Australian politician, manufacturer, merchant and colliery director.

He was born at Garrigill near Cumbria in Cumberland to storekeeper Thomas Hutchinson and Jane Phillipson. He attended Alston Grammar School and migrated to Melbourne in 1857, goldmining at Castlemaine and Ballarat. In 1860 he moved to Newcastle in New South Wales, and in 1861 he married Barbara Telena Steel, with whom he had eight children. He moved to Sydney in 1872, where he became a soap and candle merchant.

He was a Balmain alderman from 1878 and later mayor; he was also an alderman of the Municipality of The Glebe from 1893 until 1897, serving as mayor from 12 February 1894 until February 1896. In 1882 he was elected to the New South Wales Legislative Assembly for Balmain, but he did not re-contest in 1885. Hutchinson died at Glebe Point in 1897.

References

 

1839 births
1897 deaths
Members of the New South Wales Legislative Assembly
Mayors of Balmain
Mayors of The Glebe
19th-century Australian politicians
People from Alston Moor